Steven M. Bellovin is a researcher on computer networking and security. He has been a professor in the Computer Science department at Columbia University since 2005. Previously, Bellovin was a Fellow at AT&T Labs Research in Florham Park, New Jersey.

In September 2012, Bellovin was appointed Chief Technologist for the United States Federal Trade Commission, replacing Edward W. Felten, who returned to Princeton University. He served in this position from September 2012 to August 2013.

In February 2016, Bellovin became the first technology scholar for the Privacy and Civil Liberties Oversight Board.

Career 
He received a BA degree from Columbia University, and an MS and PhD in Computer Science from the University of North Carolina at Chapel Hill.
 
As a graduate student, Bellovin was one of the originators of USENET. He later suggested that Gene Spafford should create the Phage mailing list as a response to the Morris Worm.

He and Michael Merritt invented the Encrypted key exchange password-authenticated key agreement methods. He was also responsible for the discovery that one-time pads were invented in 1882, not 1917, as previously believed.

Bellovin has been active in the IETF. He was a member of the Internet Architecture Board from 1996–2002. Bellovin later was Security Area co-director, and a member of the Internet Engineering Steering Group (IESG) from 2002–2004.  He identified some key security weaknesses in the Domain Name System; this and other weaknesses eventually led to the development of DNSSEC.

He received 2007 National Computer Systems Security Award by the National Institute of Standards and Technology (NIST) and the National Security Agency (NSA). In 2001, he was elected as a member into the National Academy of Engineering for his contributions to network applications and security.

In 2015, Bellovin was part of a team of proponents that included Matt Blaze, J. Alex Halderman, Nadia Heninger, and Andrea M. Matwyshyn who successfully proposed a security research exemption to Section 1201 of the Digital Millennium Copyright Act.

Bellovin is an active NetBSD user and a NetBSD developer focusing on architectural, operational, and security issues.

Selected publications 
Bellovin is the author and co-author of several books, RFCs and technical papers, including:
 Firewalls and Internet Security: Repelling the Wily Hacker  (with W. Cheswick) – one of the first books on internet security.
 Firewalls and Internet Security: Repelling the Wily Hacker 2nd edition  (with Cheswick and Aviel D. Rubin)
 Thinking Security: Stopping Next Year's Hackers (2015) 
  Firewall-Friendly FTP
  Security Concerns for IPng
  On Many Addresses per Host
  Defending Against Sequence Number Attacks
 RFC 3514 The Security Flag in the IPv4 Header (April Fools' Day RFC)
  On the Use of Stream Control Transmission Protocol (SCTP) with IPsec (with J. Ioannidis, A. Keromytis, R. Stewart.)
  Security Mechanisms for the Internet (with J. Schiller, Ed., C. Kaufman)
  Guidelines for Cryptographic Key Management (with R. Housley)
As of October 21, 2020, his publications have been cited 19,578 times, and he has an h-index of 59.

See also
 Computer security
 Cryptography

References

External links
Missing Link: Knotty Privacy – Interview With Steven Bellovin. Heise News, August 4, 2019
"Steven M. Bellovin", DBLP Bibliography 
"Steven M. Bellovin Publications", ATT
"Amnesty v. McConnell - Declaration of Steven M. Bellovin", ACLU

Computer security academics
Members of the United States National Academy of Engineering
Living people
Stuyvesant High School alumni
Columbia College (New York) alumni
Scientists at Bell Labs
American chief technology officers
Columbia School of Engineering and Applied Science faculty
Usenet people
Cypherpunks
Year of birth missing (living people)
Federal Trade Commission personnel
People from Brooklyn